Spragueia apicalis, the yellow spragueia, is a moth of the family Noctuidae. The species was first described by Gottlieb August Wilhelm Herrich-Schäffer in 1868. It is also found in North America (including Alabama, Arkansas,  Florida, Georgia, Illinois, Kansas, Kentucky, Louisiana, Maryland, Mississippi, Missouri, North Carolina, Ohio, Oklahoma, South Carolina, Tennessee and Texas), Central America (including El Salvador and Costa Rica), Cuba and Peru.

The wingspan is about 16 mm for females and 17 mm for males. Adults are sexually dimorphic. The forewings of the males are yellow, shaded with a light orange on the outer third. The hindwings are uniform smoky dark brown. Females are gray brown. The hindwings are dark, smoky brown.

The larvae have been recorded feeding on Gutierrezia sarothrae.

References

Moths described in 1868
Acontiinae